Nicolas Koretzky is a French actor, who played as 'Morlot' in the French TV series Résistance.

Koretzky has appeared in films, television and plays in France.

Selected filmography
 Le Péril jeune (1994)
 Those Were the Days (1995)

References

Living people
20th-century French male actors
21st-century French male actors
French male film actors
French male television actors
French male stage actors
Year of birth missing (living people)